Leo Müller (from 1938 Miler; 1894–1941) was Croatian industrialist, entrepreneur, philanthropist and second son of well known Croatian industrialist Adolf Müller.

Family and personal life
Müller was born in Zagreb to a wealthy and influential Jewish family of Adolf Müller. He had an older brother Alfred Müller, also entrepreneur. Müller was married to Nada (née Spitzer) with whom he had three sons, Marijan, Rajko and Branko. Müller fought in World War I as an officer in the Austro-Hungarian Army. He was a member of the National Council of the State of Slovenes, Croats and Serbs. In 1938, on the eve of World War II, Müller, his brother and their families converted to Catholicism and change their surname to Miler due to political situation and antisemitism caused by Nazi propaganda. In 1939, with his wife and two sons Müller moved to London, while his youngest son Branko stayed in Zagreb with his governess. At the beginning of World War II, Müller returned to Zagreb for his son. Müller arranged that his son and governess move to Kosovska Mitrovica where he had a mine. Müller refused to believe that like other Jews he will be arrested and deported to concentration camp. Cardinal Aloysius Stepinac urged Ante Pavelić to save Müller, but in November, 1941 Müller was killed at the Jasenovac concentration camp. After the war Müller's wife returned to Zagreb and sought the return of the Müller's family seized property, but without success. His eldest son, Marijan, made Aliyah to Israel in the 1940s. Müller two other sons, Rajko and Branko stayed in Zagreb with their mother. Both of them were skilled athletes. After graduation at the Faculty of Kinesiology at the University of Zagreb, Branko Müller moved to Freiburg where he worked as a professor of athletics.

Business career
From his father, Müller inherited the brick factory in Zagreb and brickyard near Karlovac. In the mid-1930, Müller founded the chemical laboratory which would later become the large plantation for planting fruits and vegetables, known as "Müllerov Brijeg". Müller improved the business of the Zagreb brick factory. He was very loved and popular among his employees, for whom he built the Catholic Church in front of the brick factory, organized and provided night school, kitchen with hot meals, and workers orchestra.

References

Bibliography

 
 

1894 births
1941 deaths
Businesspeople from Zagreb
Croatian Jews who died in the Holocaust
Austro-Hungarian Jews
Croatian Austro-Hungarians
Converts to Roman Catholicism from Judaism
Croatian businesspeople
Croatian philanthropists
Jewish philanthropists
Croatian civilians killed in World War II
People who died in Jasenovac concentration camp
Croatian people executed in Nazi concentration camps
20th-century philanthropists
Yugoslav businesspeople